Lev Aleksandrovich Berezner (born 6 June 1970) is a former Russian professional football player.

Club career
He played for the main squad of FC Dynamo Moscow in the USSR Federation Cup.

External links
 

1970 births
Living people
People from Obninsk
Soviet footballers
Russian footballers
Soviet First League players
Soviet Second League players
Soviet Second League B players
Russian Premier League players
Ukrainian Premier League players
Russian expatriate footballers
Expatriate footballers in Ukraine
Russian expatriate sportspeople in Ukraine
FC Dynamo Moscow players
FC Dinamo Sukhumi players
FC Bukovyna Chernivtsi players
FC Chernomorets Novorossiysk players
Association football midfielders
State University of Management alumni
Sportspeople from Kaluga Oblast